Ghattupally is a village and panchayat in Vikarabad district, TS, India. It falls under Pudur mandal.

References

Villages in Ranga Reddy district